Tankaro Ga   is a village in the commune of Parakou in the Borgou Department of central-eastern Benin. It is located west of Parakou city centre.

External links
Satellite map at Maplandia

Populated places in the Borgou Department
Commune of Parakou